The J Team is a 2021 American children/family musical drama film directed by Michael Lembeck, executive-produced by JoJo Siwa and produced by Nickelodeon Movies which debuted as an original film on Paramount+ on September 3, 2021.

Premise
JoJo Siwa is part of a dance troupe that was run by Val (Laura Soltis). When Val retires, she is replaced by the strict Coach Poppy (Tisha Campbell) who brings about harsh rules and kicks JoJo out of her troupe after she fails to live up to her expectations. While rediscovering dancing and friendship, JoJo meets other dancers as they form a dance troupe called the J Team.

Cast
 JoJo Siwa as a fictional version of herself
 Marley Winton as young JoJo Siwa
 Tisha Campbell as Coach Poppy, a strict and sparkle-hating dance coach who kicks JoJo out of the dance troupe she now runs
 Kiyoko Rain Gordon as young Coach Poppy
 Laura Soltis as Val, JoJo's former dance coach and Coach Poppy's predecessor
 Julia Marley as Nina
 Kerrynton Jones as Ruby M., one of JoJo's best friends
 Kiara T. Romero as Ruby D., one of JoJo's best friends
 Kenya Jordan as Pepper
 Kyra Leroux as Jess
 Mya Lowe as Sunshine
 Marlow Percival as Desi
 Chris Francisque as Mr. Melody
 Clay St. Thomas as Announcer

Production 

In February 2020, it was reported that a JoJo Siwa film project was in the works at Nickelodeon. In February 2021, Siwa announced on The Tonight Show that title of the project was The J Team, and that she was to star and produce the film. It was also announced that an original soundtrack, including six songs written by Siwa, would be released alongside the film, and that filming would begin that month, in Vancouver, British Columbia, Canada.

Soundtrack 

The eponymous soundtrack album of the film was released by Viacom International on 27 August 2021. A music video for one of its singles, "Dance Through the Day" on 6 August 2021, including behind-the-scenes footage from the film.

All songs are produced by Matthew Tishler and performed by JoJo Siwa.

Performance controversy 
A week after the film's debut on September 15, Siwa called out Nickelodeon on social media for preventing her from performing any songs from the film on the 2022 edition of her D.R.E.A.M. Tour, claiming that she is "treated as only a brand" by the company. The situation has been described as similar to that of Miley Cyrus, Demi Lovato and Selena Gomez, all of whom were signed to a major children's television network at a young age.

Release 
A one-minute trailer for the film was released on July 27, 2021. A drive-in premiere screening of the film was held at the Rose Bowl in Pasadena, California on September 3, 2021, releasing exclusively on Paramount+ the same day. The movie aired on Nickelodeon on November 7, 2021, as well as on the Nick Jr. Channel and TeenNick. The film was also released on DVD on July 12, 2022 Also the film had its television premiere on Nickelodeon across Europe, the Middle East and Africa.

References

External links 
 

2021 films
2021 drama films
2020s American films
2020s children's drama films
2020s dance films
2020s English-language films
2020s musical drama films
American children's drama films
American children's musical films
American dance films
American musical drama films
Films about dance competitions
Films directed by Michael Lembeck
Films shot in Vancouver
Nickelodeon Movies films
Paramount+ original films